Mitsuyo Yoshida (吉田実代, Yoshida Mitsuyo, born 12 April 1988) is a Japanese professional boxer who has held the WBO junior-bantamweight title since 2021. As of April 2020, she is ranked as the world's ninth best active female junior-bantamweight by BoxRec.

Professional career
Yoshida made her professional debut on 28 May 2014, scoring a four-round majority decision (MD) over Ayaka Sato at the Korakuen Hall in Tokto, Japan. Two judges scored the bout 39–37 in favour of Yoshida while the third scored it a draw at 38–38. After winning her first four fights, she suffered the first defeat of her career against Yuki Koseki on 13 March 2016, losing via unanimous decision (UD) over four rounds with scores of 38–39, 37–39 and 36–40. 

Yoshida bounced back with three victories before defeating Tomomi Takano by UD over six rounds to capture the inaugural Japanese female bantamweight title, with all three judges scoring the bout 58–57. The bout took place on 6 October 2017 at the Korakuen Hall. After successfully defending the title in March 2018 against Kai Johnson, winning via six-round UD, Yoshida defeated Gretel de Paz on 20 August 2018 at the Korakuen Hall to capture the OPBF female bantamweight title. The fight was stopped in the fifth round after Yoshida was cut from an accidental clash of heads, causing the decision to rest on the scorecards over the five rounds that had been contested. Yoshida won via technical decision (TD) with two judges scoring the bout 49–46 and the third scoring it 48–47.  

Following successful defences of her OPBF and Japanese titles in September 2018 and March 2019 respectively, both by UD, Yoshida challenged for her first world title against Casey Morton on 19 June at the Makuhari Messe in Chiba, Japan. Yoshida won the bout via UD (100–90, 100–90, 99–91) to capture the vacant WBO female junior-bantamweight title.

Professional boxing record

References

Living people
1988 births
Japanese women boxers
Sportspeople from Kagoshima Prefecture
Super-flyweight boxers
Bantamweight boxers
World Boxing Organization champions
People from Kagoshima